The 1958 Victorian Tourist Trophy was a motor race staged at the Albert Park Circuit in Victoria, Australia on 23 November 1958.
It was restricted to open or closed Sports Cars complying with CAMS Appendix C regulations.
The race was contested over 32 laps of the 3.125 mile circuit, a total distance of approximately 100 miles.

The race was won by Doug Whiteford driving a Maserati 300S.

Results

Notes
 Entries: 27
 Start: Massed grid start
 Starters: Unknown
 Finishers: Unknown
 Winner's race time: 65 minutes 47.2 seconds
 Fastest Lap: D Whiteford & R Phillips: 2:01.02  (average 93.8 mph)

References

Victorian Tourist Trophy
Motorsport at Albert Park
November 1958 sports events in Australia
1950s in Victoria (Australia)